Albert Khelfa (born January 11, 1945) is a Canadian former politician. Khelfa served in the National Assembly of Quebec from 1985 to 1994 as a member of the Liberal Party.

Early life and career

Khelfa was born in Cairo, Egypt, and received a diploma in dental surgery from the University of Cairo. After moving to Canada, he earned a Bachelor's Degree in education and a certificate in business administration from the Université du Québec à Trois-Rivières and a certificate in testing and assessment from the University of Montreal. He was a secondary school teacher in comparative biology and human biology in Sorel from 1969 to 1983 and taught English at the primary level from 1983 to 1985. He also served on the executive of the Teachers' Union of Sorel from 1976 to 1980 and was president of the Sorel-Tracy Multicultural Group from 1978 to 1980.

Legislator

Khelfa was first elected to the Quebec legislature in the 1985 general election, defeating Parti Québécois cabinet minister Maurice Martel in the Richelieu division. The Liberals won a majority government in this election under Robert Bourassa, and Khelfa entered the legislature as a government backbencher. He was appointed to the legislative committee on education and culture in 1986. In 1988, he supported the Bourassa government's compromise on Quebec's language laws, in which only francophone signs, billboards, and posters were permitted outdoors but bilingual signs were allowed indoors.

Khelfa was returned again in the 1989 general election, and was re-appointed to the committee on culture later in the year. He spoke against a neo-nazi rally that was held at a small town in his riding in 1992.

He was defeated by Parti Québécois candidate Sylvain Simard in 1994, as the Liberal Party lost power to the PQ provincially.

After politics

Khelfa became a senior management and international development consultant after leaving the Quebec legislature. He was appointed to the board of directors of the Klondike Star Mineral Corporation on October 12, 2006, and resigned two years later.

Electoral record

External links

References

This biography incorporates information from Khelfa's entry in the 1994 Canadian Parliamentary Guide (p. 936).

1945 births
Quebec Liberal Party MNAs
Living people
Canadian politicians of Egyptian descent